Indie Press Revolution (also referred to as "IPR") is a sales network that acts as a fulfillment house for publishers of indie role-playing games. It was founded in 2004 by Ed Cha of Open World Press and Brennan Taylor of Galileo Games. IPR represents over 100 author/publishers involved in role-playing games. It offers games directly to the public and to game retailers.

On June 17, 2010 DOJ, Inc. (which also owns Hero Games) announced that they have purchased a majority share of IPR. Brennan Taylor has stepped down as President and maintains a minority share. Jason Walters is now acting general manager, and much of IPR's energy is currently focused on expanding its convention presence, growing its retailer network, and attracting new publishers.

Member companies
 4 Winds Fantasy Gaming
 Archaia Studios
 Atomic Sock Monkey Press
 Bad Axe Games
 Black & Green Games
 Blue Devil Games
 Bob Goat Press
 BoxNinja
 Bully Pulpit Games
 Burning Wheel
 Catthulhu.com
 Cherry Picked Games
 Chimera Creative
 Cold Blooded Games
 Contested Ground Studios
 Clinton R. Nixon
 Dark Omen Games
 End Transmission Games
 Evil Hat Productions
 Galileo Games
 glyphpress
 Hamsterprophet Productions
 Hefty Wrenches Game Design
 Incarnadine Press
 Itesser Ink
 Kevin Allen Jr
 Machine Age Productions
 Malcontent Games
 Memento Mori Theatricks
 Mob United Media
 Muse of Fire Games
 Open World Press
 Paka's Thread Games
 Pelgrane Press
 Precis Intermedia 
 Prince of Darkness Games
 Ramshead Publishing
 Realms Publishing
 Steampower Publishing
 TAO Games
 TCK Roleplaying
 Timfire Publishing
 Twisted Confessions

External links
 Indie Press Revolution 
 Interview with IPR Founders Ed Cha and Brennan Taylor

References 

Indie role-playing games
Role-playing game publishing companies